Beth Israel Cemetery is a  Jewish cemetery in the borough of Sainte-Foy–Sillery–Cap-Rouge, Quebec City, Quebec, Canada. It is designated a National Historic Site of Canada.

History
The property was obtained by the Beth Israel Ohev Sholom Congregation in 1894.

References

External links
 

Jewish cemeteries in Quebec
National Historic Sites in Quebec
Religion in Quebec City